Avaj County is in Qazvin province, Iran. The capital of the county is the city of Avaj. At the 2006 census, the region's population (as Abgarm and Avaj Districts of Buin Zahra County) was 38,096 in 9,737 households. The following census in 2011 counted 43,547 people in 13,004 households. At the 2016 census, the county's population was 43,798 in 13,818 households, by which time the districts had been separated from the county to form Avaj County.

Administrative divisions

The population history and structural changes of Avaj County's administrative divisions over three consecutive censuses are shown in the following table. The latest census shows two districts, five rural districts, and two cities.

References

 

Counties of Qazvin Province